Zach Lofton (born November 18, 1992) is an American professional basketball player for Dynamo Lebanon of the Lebanese Basketball League. He played college basketball for New Mexico State University (NMSU). He transferred to NMSU from Texas Southern, where he was named the Southwestern Athletic Conference Player of the Year in 2017.

College career
Lofton, a shooting guard from Saint Paul, Minnesota, started his college career at San Jacinto College, then played his sophomore season for Illinois State University. He averaged 11.3 points per game for the Redbirds before transferring to Minnesota in 2014. While sitting out his transfer year, Lofton was dismissed from the Golden Gophers team before playing a game. Lofton landed at Texas Southern, where in 2016–17 he averaged 16.8 points per game and led the Tigers to the 2017 NCAA tournament. At the close of the season, he was named SWAC Player of the Year and Newcomer of the Year.

Following his lone season with Texas Southern, Lofton declared for the 2017 NBA draft. Although he ultimately withdrew, he did announce that he would transfer from Texas Southern. He ultimately chose New Mexico State to play his final season of college eligibility.

As a senior at New Mexico State, Lofton averaged 20.1 points and 5.0 rebounds per game. He shot 46 percent from the field and 38 percent from behind the arc. Lofton was named to the All-Western Athletic Conference First Team and the 2018 All-WAC Newcomer team. Following the season he participated in the 2018 Portsmouth Invitational Tournament.

Professional career
Lofton was not selected in the 2018 NBA draft. He signed with the Detroit Pistons for the NBA Summer League. He averaged 10.8 points and 2.5 rebounds per game and scored 21 points in the final Summer League game against the Los Angeles Lakers. Lofton subsequently signed with the Pistons and, in October, agreed to a two-way contract, splitting playing time with the Pistons and their NBA G League affiliate, the Grand Rapids Drive. On October 17, 2018, Lofton made his NBA debut with the Pistons. He recorded one steal in four minutes of play in a 103–100 win over the Brooklyn Nets. In his G League debut, Lofton had a double-double with 26 points, 11 rebounds, nine assists and four steals as the Drive lost to the Erie BayHawks 125–114.

On January 15, 2019, Lofton was waived by the Pistons, but retained by the Drive. He averaged 13.3 points, 3.1 rebounds, 2.3 assists, and 1.2 steals per game with the Drive. On February 1, 2020, Lofton signed with the Rostock Seawolves of the German ProA league. He averaged 27.7 points, 4.7 rebounds and 4.0 assists per game. On July 18, 2021, Lofton signed with Kazma of the Kuwaiti Division I Basketball League.
Now, he is playing with Dynamo Club in Lebanon in the Lebanese basketball league.

Career statistics

NBA

Regular season

|-
| style="text-align:left;"| 
| style="text-align:left;"| Detroit
| 1 || 0 || 3.8 || .000 || .000 || – || .0 || .0 || 1.0 || .0 || .0

References

External links
New Mexico State Aggies bio
Minnesota Golden Gophers bio

1992 births
Living people
21st-century African-American sportspeople
African-American basketball players
American expatriate basketball people in Germany
American men's basketball players
Basketball players from Saint Paul, Minnesota
Detroit Pistons players
Grand Rapids Drive players
Illinois State Redbirds men's basketball players
New Mexico State Aggies men's basketball players
Rostock Seawolves players
San Jacinto Central Ravens men's basketball players
Shooting guards
Texas Southern Tigers men's basketball players
Undrafted National Basketball Association players